Ultrasis Group Plc (LSE: ULT)is a healthcare company based in the United Kingdom which develops computerised healthcare products based on Cognitive Behavioural Therapy (CBT).

The company's products cover stress, anxiety and depression problems. One of the company's products has been recommended by the National Institute for Health and Clinical Excellence (NICE) as a treatment option for all people with mild or moderate depression.

The Company was created when in 1999 Villiers Plc acquired the Healthcare company Ultramind and renamed it Ultrasis. Ultramind was established by Tuvi Orbach to develop computerised applications empowering people to improve their wellbeing.

The company secured a £5 million refinancing deal with shareholder Paul Bell in December 2014. However, the company declared bankruptcy in 2015 having failed to secure further investment from Bell or others.

References

Health care companies of the United Kingdom
Software companies of the United Kingdom
Companies listed on the London Stock Exchange